Your Face Sounds Familiar Kids is a spin-off of the singing and impersonation competition for celebrities Your Face Sounds Familiar. The show debuted on January 7, 2017, on ABS-CBN, replacing Pinoy Boyband Superstar. The show is hosted by Billy Crawford, with Sharon Cuneta, Gary Valenciano and Ogie Alcasid serves as the show's judges. The show ended on August 19, 2018, and was replaced by The Kids' Choice.

Overview
The show is a spin-off of Your Face Sounds Familiar of which is part of the Your Face Sounds Familiar franchise. However, in this show, child celebrities participate. The show airs on ABS-CBN during weekends.

Format
The show challenges child celebrities to perform as different music icons for 14–16 weeks.
 
Each contestant impersonates a different singer each week, and performs an iconic song and dance routine well known by that particular icon. The "Iconizer" assigns icons to the contestants and can assign any icon living or dead regardless of its age, race or gender.

They are then judged a panel of celebrity judges called "The Jury". The contestants are awarded 4 to 8 stars by the jury. The total score of each contestant is counted by summing the stars from judges. In case of a tie, the judges will choose the week's winner.

Whoever is at the top of the leaderboard at the end of the each show receives a cash prize for themselves and a charity of their choice.

All contestants then advance after 13 or 15 weeks of competition into the finale called "The Grand Showdown". The contestants will personally select the icon they wish to pick for the said event. The winner is then decided by a score composed of the total stars from the jury and the votes cast by the public.

Development
On August 15, 2016, Billy Crawford announced that Your Face Sounds Familiar will return for a third season, which was later revealed as the "Kids" edition. The first Kids season premiered on January 7, 2017.

On March 5, 2017, Xia Vigor could not perform on the show because of her sickness and was announced to impersonate Jennifer Lopez on the following week instead.

On March 28, 2018, ABS-CBN released a teaser for its upcoming season (season 2 as "Kids" edition, season 4 overall). It premiered on May 5, 2018.

On May 5, 2018, the second season of the Kids edition premiered, replacing the timeslot of the sixth season of Pilipinas Got Talent. Billy Crawford returned as the host of that season. The Jury, who serves as the judges of the show, are Ogie Alcasid, Sharon Cuneta and Gary Valenciano. In this season, Jed Madela (vocals) and Nyoy Volante (choreography and movement) served as the kids' mentors, replacing Annie Quintos and Georcelle Dapat-Sy of G-Force respectively. Season 1 contestants Sam Shoaf, AC Bonifacio and Awra Briguela host the online companion show. The online companion show Your Face Sounds Familiar Kids: Breaktime is hosted by season 1 contestants Sam Shoaf, AC Bonifacio and Awra Briguela. It airs simultaneously with the main show, being streamed live on both the official Facebook page and YouTube channel of the show. Breaktime features behind-the-scene exclusives which are usually not aired on the main show. It also includes interviews of the cast and live comments from the viewers. It may or may not air in future seasons. Gary Valenciano had an emergency heart surgery weeks before the taping. Mentors Jed Madela and Nyoy Volante served as the guest judges until Week 12. They gave stars to the kid celebrity performers as one. On Week 15, a duet week between Season 1 and Season 2 Kids contestants took place on the show. However, Xia Vigor was unable to perform alongside her partner, Onyok Pineda due to her prior commitments. Because of this, Bella Echarri was invited to perform in her place.

On March 21, 2020, the first season was re-run on the primetime lineup of ABS-CBN's Yes Weekend block, temporarily replacing the ongoing season of The Voice Teens until the network was shut down.

Prize
Every week, the weekly winner will receive a medal and cash prize worth ₱100,000, where half will be given to the winner's charity of choice.

The grand prize is a usually trophy and a cash prize worth ₱1,000,000. Additional prizes such as a house and lot, tickets to a particular location and gadget showcases are also given to the champion but it varies per season.

Host and judges

Host 
Billy Crawford served as a host for both seasons.

The Jury 
In each season there are three members of the jury. In an event that a sitting jury member cannot fulfill their duties for a particular week, a temporary replacement will take their place in that particular week.

Regular 

 Sharon Cuneta (season 1-)
 Gary Valenciano (season 1-)
 Ogie Alcasid (season 1-)

Guest Judges 

 Nyoy Volante and Jed Madela (Valenciano's replacement judges for Week 3 to Week 10)
 Nyoy Volante (Valenciano's replacement judge for Week 11 and 12)

Mentors 
In each season there are two mentors (one for vocals and another for choreography) to aid the contestant in impersonating the icon that was assigned to them.

Current 

 Jed Madela (vocals) (season 2-)
 Nyoy Volante (choreography) (season 2-)

Former 

 Annie Quintos (vocals) (season 1)
 Georcelle Dapat-Sy (choreography) (season 1)

Season summary

See also
 List of programs broadcast by ABS-CBN

References

 
Philippine television series based on Dutch television series
2017 Philippine television series debuts
2018 Philippine television series endings
Filipino-language television shows